Elkhorn is a census-designated place (CDP) in Jefferson County, Montana, United States, in the Elkhorn Mountains of the southwestern part of the state. As of the 2010 census it had a population of 10. The community is considered a ghost town, and two of its buildings are preserved as Elkhorn State Park.

History
Lodes of silver, described by geologists as supergene enrichments, were initially discovered in the Elkhorn Mountains by Peter Wys, a Swiss immigrant. Six years later, Anton Holter, a pioneer capitalist from Helena, began developing the mine. Over $14 million in silver was carried from the mine. In 1890, the Sherman Silver Purchase Act passed, creating a high demand for Elkhorn's silver.

During this peak period, Elkhorn had 2,500 inhabitants, a school, a hotel, a church, stores, saloons, and brothels. Unlike most mining towns, Elkhorn was populated mostly by families of married European immigrants. In 1893, the Fraternity Hall was constructed for social gatherings, and still remains as one of the most well-preserved buildings in modern Elkhorn.

In the years following, the silver boom and Elkhorn's prosperity began to lessen as the desire for silver decreased. A diphtheria epidemic struck Elkhorn in the winter of 1888–1889, resulting in many deaths, particularly of children. Soon after, railroad service to Elkhorn was halted and only a fraction of the original inhabitants remained.

The state of Montana designated Fraternity Hall and Gillian Hall as Elkhorn State Park in 1980.

Geography
Elkhorn is in eastern Jefferson County on the south side of the Elkhorn Mountains, in the valley of Elkhorn Creek.

Demographics

While very few standing buildings remain of the original Elkhorn, a number of cabins have been reoccupied and refurbished. In 2010, there were 10 inhabitants.

See also
 List of ghost towns in Montana
 Montana Ghost Town Preservation Society

References

External links

Elkhorn State Park Montana Fish, Wildlife & Parks
Elkhorn, Montana at Western Mining History
Profile for Elkhorn, Montana ePodunk

Ghost towns in Montana
Census-designated places in Jefferson County, Montana
Census-designated places in Montana
Geography of Jefferson County, Montana